Blennerhasset and Torpenhow is a civil parish in the Borough of Allerdale in Cumbria, England.  It contains 15 buildings that are recorded in the National Heritage List for England as designated listed buildings.  Of these, one is listed at Grade I, the highest of the three grades, and the others are at Grade II, the lowest grade.  The parish contains the villages of Blennerhasset and Torpenhow, and the smaller settlements of Kirkland Guards and Whitrigg, and is otherwise rural.  Most of the listed buildings are houses, cottages, farmhouses and farm buildings, the latter including buildings on a model farm.  The other listed buildings are a church, a milestone, and two war memorials.


Key

Buildings

References

Citations

Sources

Lists of listed buildings in Cumbria